NAC Fanzine De Rat, commonly known as De Rat, is an independent fanzine for the Dutch football club NAC Breda.http://www.derat.nl/int/nl/fanzine/info.asp, Information about NAC Fanzine De Rat.http://www.bndestem.nl/regio/breda/article601829.ece, Newsarticle BN/De Stem The fanzine was sold for the first time on 11 August 1996 and is the longest established fanzine in the Netherlands. The fanzine is published 8 times during the football season and the fanzine’s circulation in January 2010 was 700 copies. The fanzine is sold before matches of NAC Breda, around the Rat Verlegh Stadion.

The name De Rat is derived from NAC icon Antoon Verlegh, who was nicknamed De Rat because of playing style. He was a player, trainer, editor, secretary, member of the board, vice chairman and chairman of honour at NAC Breda.Andries Schouten, Jules Ots and Adriaan Veraart (1962), ’50 jaar NAC’ Verlegh also had several important positions at the KNVB and he was considered to be one of the football icons in the Netherlands until the 1950s.http://www.derat.nl/int/nl/club/historiepersoonsinfo.asp?persid=385, player profile on NAC Fanzine De Rat ONLINE The fanzine was named after Antoon ‘De Rat’ Verlegh, to commemorate Verlegh’s positive impact and to bring NAC Breda’s history to the public.

References

External links
 Homepage NAC Fanzine The Rat 

Football fanzines
NAC Breda